= Club Free Time =

US online publication

- Available in: English
- Founded: 1987
- Headquarters: New York City, {{{location_country}}}
- Website: Club Free Time

Club Free Time is an online publication dedicated to free cultural events that take place in New York City, primarily in Manhattan. Its listings provide information about free lectures, concerts, plays, films, tours, art exhibit openings and similar cultural offerings. Some other sources, such as New York or Time Out New York, also cover free events from time to time, but Club Free Time's listings are significantly more comprehensive and detailed.

In addition, Club Free Time distributes complimentary tickets to paid theatrical and music events, such as classical music concerts and Off-Broadway shows, a practice known in the theatrical world as papering. These tickets are only available to the organization's subscribers. It is one of several papering organizations in New York City.

The organization operates on a paid subscription model.

== History and profile ==
Club Free Time was founded in 1987. It began as a print-based 6-page newsletter about free cultural events in New York City. It grew to 48 pages within the first year, added a web presence in 2001, and switched to web-only operation in 2007. The founder, Natella Vaidman, was an immigrant from Russia. The organization has been featured in major publications such as the New York Times, the Wall Street Journal and Crain's New York Business. In addition, although it publishes in English, the organization is regularly featured in Russian-language media.
